Melanis pixe, the red-bordered pixie, is a species in the butterfly family Riodinidae. It was described by Jean Baptiste Boisduval in 1836.

Description
The upperside of the wings is black. The tip of forewing is yellow orange and the base has a red spot. The hindwing outer margin has a band of red spots. Eggs are laid in groups of 10 to 30 on the host tree leaves, stems, or bark and the caterpillars feed on the leaves.

Distribution and habitat
This species is found in the Lower Rio Grande Valley of South Texas south to Costa Rica.

Biology
The larvae feed on Albizia caribea, Inga species and Pithecellobium species (including Pithecellobium dulce).

Subspecies
pixe Mexico
sanguinea (Stichel, 1910) Costa Rica - Panama

References

Riodininae
Butterflies described in 1836